Christopher Hook (born January 11, 1947) is a Canadian sprint canoer who competed in the late 1960s. He finished ninth in the C-1 1000 m event at the 1968 Summer Olympics in Mexico City.

Hook was born in Dartmouth, Nova Scotia and started his sporting career at the Banook Canoe Club. He was inducted into the Nova Scotia Sports Hall of Fame in 1982.

Career highlights
 1963 Canadian Juvenile Canoe singles title.
 1963 North American Juvenile title.
 1966 1,000 metre and 10,000 metre North American titles.
 1967 1,000 metres.
 1968  9th in the Olympics
 1968 North American 1,000 and 10,000 metre titles.
 1969 Canadian 1,000 metre champion.

References

External links
Sports-reference.com profile

1947 births
Canadian male canoeists
Canoeists at the 1968 Summer Olympics
Living people
Olympic canoeists of Canada
Sportspeople from Dartmouth, Nova Scotia